Chehriq (also Chahriq, Chiriq, Charik, Čahrīk or Shimko) is a citadel located in north-western Iran in West Azarbaijan Province, Salmas County, near the Turkish border.

History
The Báb was imprisoned at Chehriq prior to his execution at Tabriz in 1850. It has been said that Báb denoted the citadel in his writings as Jabal alshadid meaning mount extreme where the word shadid (meaning extreme) has numerical value of 318 in Arabic equaling numerical value of Jehriq.

Notes

Castles in Iran
Buildings and structures in West Azerbaijan Province